Sinja Kraus (born 29 April 2002) is an Austrian tennis player.

Kraus has career-high WTA rankings of 192 in singles and world No. 345 in doubles, both achieved January 2023.
She reached a career-high ITF juniors ranking of No. 87, on 21 January 2019.

Kraus also won a bronze medal at the 2017 European Youth Summer Olympic Festival in Győr.

She represents Austria in the Fed Cup and made her debut in 2020, when she partnered Melanie Klaffner in the tie against Italy, losing to Giulia Gatto-Monticone and Martina Trevisan.

Grand Slam singles performance timeline

ITF finals

Singles: 10 (4 titles, 6 runner–ups)

Doubles: 1 (title)

Junior career

ITF Circuit finals

Singles: 5 (4–1)

Doubles: 5 (3–2)

National representation
Kraus was nominated to make her Fed Cup debut for Austria in 2019, while the team was competing in the Europe/Africa Zone Group II, the opponent forfeited the match.

Fed Cup

Singles (4–4)

Doubles (4–3)

* walkover doesn't count in her overall record.

References

External links
 
 
 

Living people

2002 births
Austrian female tennis players